Valovoy Kordon is a rural locality (a selo) in Simonovsky Selsoviet, Uglovsky District, Altai Krai, Russia. The population was 274 as of 2013. It was founded in 1898. There are 4 streets.

Geography 
Valovoy Kordon is located 59 km north of Uglovskoye (the district's administrative centre) by road. Ust-Kormikha is the nearest rural locality.

References 

Rural localities in Uglovsky District, Altai Krai